Thierry Gillet (born 20 December 1969) is a top France jockey  who won the 2004 Prix de l'Arc de Triomphe aboard Bago, a thoroughbred race horse he has ridden in  14 of his career starts. In April 2009, at age 39, Gillet announced his retirement from racing, citing recurring weight problems. He won 904 races in his career.

In 2007, he won the Critérium de Saint-Cloud riding the colt  Full of Gold.

Wins
Two-time winner of the Critérium International, in 2001 and 2003.
Six-time winner of the Prix de Pomone: Bright Moon (1993, 1994), Helen of Spain (1996), Interlude (2000), Abitara (2001), Lune d'Or (2004)
Two-time winner of the  Prix Ganay in 2004 and 2005.
 Prix du Calvados, 1999 and 2003.
 Prix Minerve 1996 and 2002
 Prix Chloé 1997 and 1999
 Premio Mario Incisa della Rocchetta 1999 and 2001
 Prix Noailles 2008
 Grand Prix de Paris 2004
 Prix Vermeille 2004
 Prix Jean Romanet 2004
 Prix des Chênes 2003
 Prix de la Nonette 1999
 Prix de Seine-et-Oise 1999
 Prix Vanteaux 1999
 Prix du Lys 1998
 Prix de l'Arc de Triomphe 2004

Notes

French jockeys
Living people
1969 births